Flumina is a double studio album by musicians Christian Fennesz and Ryuichi Sakamoto, following their previous collaboration Cendre, released in 2007.

Track listing
Disc one
"0318" – 4:27
"0319" – 5:39
"0320" – 4:42
"0322" – 5:34
"0324" – 6:48
"0325" – 4:20
"0327" – 5:29
"0328" – 5:29
"0330" – 4:44
"0401" – 4:55
"0402" – 6:15
"0404" – 4:34

Disc two
"0405" – 4:50
"0407" – 4:37
"0409" – 4:52
"0411"	- 5:22
"0415"	- 5:13
"0417" – 3:44
"0419"	- 4:59
"0423" – 5:17
"0424"	- 4:27
"0425"	- 6:56
"0428"	- 4:54
"0429" – 5:58

Personnel
Ryuichi Sakamoto – piano, laptop
Christian Fennesz – guitar, laptop

References

2011 albums
Ryuichi Sakamoto albums
Fennesz albums
Collaborative albums
Touch Music albums